Mesmerized is the first studio album released by Christian singer Meredith Andrews.

Track listing

References 

2005 debut albums
Meredith Andrews albums